Mont Turia is a shoulder on the north ridge of Mont Pourri in Savoie, France. It lies in the Massif de la Vanoise range. It has an elevation of 3,646 metres above sea level.

References

Alpine three-thousanders
Mountains of the Alps
Mountains of Savoie